Frank Wellington Wess (January 4, 1922 – October 30, 2013) was an American jazz saxophonist and flutist. In addition to his extensive solo work, Wess is remembered for his time in Count Basie's band from the early 1950s into the 1960s. Critic Scott Yanow described him as one of the premier proteges of Lester Young, and a leading jazz flutist of his era—using the latter instrument to bring new colors to Basie's music.

Biography
Wess was born in Kansas City, Missouri, United States, the son of a principal father and a schoolteacher mother. He began with classical music training and played in Oklahoma in high school. He later switched to jazz on moving to Washington, D.C. and by nineteen was working with big bands. His career was interrupted by World War II although he did play with a military band in the period. After leaving the military, he joined Billy Eckstine's orchestra. He returned to Washington D.C. a few years afterwards and received a degree in flute at the city's Modern School of Music. He played tenor sax with Count Basie from 1953 to 1964, doubling on flute.

Wess was considered one of the best jazz flutists of his time. From 1959 to 1964, he won the Down Beat magazine critics' poll for flute.

He was a member of Clark Terry's big band from 1967 into the 1970s and played in the New York Jazz Quartet (with Roland Hanna). He also did a variety of work for TV. In 1968 he contributed to the album The Jazz Composer's Orchestra. He played tenor and alto sax, doubling on flute throughout his career.

In the 1980s and 1990s, he worked with Kenny Barron, Rufus Reid, Buck Clayton, Benny Carter, Billy Taylor, Harry Edison, Mel Tormé, Ernestine Anderson, Louie Bellson, John Pizzarelli, Howard Alden, Dick Hyman, Jane Jarvis, Frank Vignola and was a featured member of the Toshiko Akiyoshi Jazz Orchestra. In the 2000s, Wess released two albums with Hank Jones. In 2007, Wess was named an NEA Jazz Master by the U.S. National Endowment for the Arts.

Wess died from a heart attack related to kidney failure on October 30, 2013.

Discography

As leader
 Flutes & Reeds (Savoy, 1955) with Ernie Wilkins
 North, South, East....Wess (Savoy, 1956)
 Opus in Swing (Savoy, 1956) with Kenny Burrell and Freddie Greene
 Jazz for Playboys (Savoy, 1957) with Joe Newman, Kenny Burrell and Freddie Greene
 Wheelin' & Dealin' (Prestige, 1957) with John Coltrane
 Opus de Blues (Savoy, 1959 [1984]) - also released as I Hear Ya Talkin The Frank Wess Quartet (Moodsville, 1960)
 Southern Comfort (Prestige, 1962)
 Yo Ho! Poor You, Little Me (Prestige, 1963)
 Wess to Memphis (1970)
 Flute of the Loom (1973)
 Flute Juice (Progressive, 1981)
 Two at the Top (Uptown, 1983) with Johnny Coles
 Two for the Blues (Pablo, 1984) with Frank Foster
 Frankly Speaking (Concord Jazz, 1985) with Frank Foster
 Entre Nous (Concord, 1990)
 Going Wess (1993)
 Tryin' to Make My Blues Turn Green (Concord, 1994)
 Surprise, Surprise (Chiaroscuro, 1995)
 Hank and Frank (2002)
 Hank and Frank II (2009)
 Magic 101 (IPO, 2013)With the New York Jazz Quartet In Concert in Japan (Salvation, 1975)
 Surge (Enja, 1977)
 Song of the Black Knight (Sonet, 1977)
 Blues for Sarka (Enja, 1978)
 New York Jazz Quartet in Chicago (Bee Hive, 1981)
 Oasis (Enja, 1981)

As sidemanWith Toshiko AkiyoshiTen Gallon Shuffle (Victor / BMG, 1984)
Wishing Peace (Ken (Japan), 1986)
Carnegie Hall Concert (Columbia, 1992)With Manny Albam The Soul of the City (Solid State, 1966)With Lorez AlexandriaEarly in the Morning (Argo, 1960)With Earl Washington (musician) Earl Washington All-Stars (Workshop, 1962)With Gene Ammons Velvet Soul (Prestige, 1960 [1964])
 Angel Eyes (Prestige, 1960 [1965])With Dorothy Ashby The Jazz Harpist (Regent, 1957)
 Hip Harp (Prestige, 1958)
 In a Minor Groove (New Jazz, 1958)With Count Basie Count Basie and the Kansas City 7 (Impulse!, 1962)With Count Basie Orchestra Dance Session (Clef, 1953)
 Dance Session Album #2 (Clef, 1954)
 Basie (Clef, 1954)
 Count Basie Swings, Joe Williams Sings (Clef, 1955) with Joe Williams
 April in Paris (Verve, 1956)
 The Greatest!! Count Basie Plays, Joe Williams Sings Standards with Joe Williams
 Metronome All-Stars 1956 (Clef, 1956) with Ella Fitzgerald and Joe Williams
 Hall of Fame (Verve, 1956 [1959])
 Basie in London (Verve, 1956)
 One O'Clock Jump (1957)
 The Atomic Mr. Basie (Roulette, 1957) aka Basie and E=MC2
 Basie Plays Hefti (Roulette, 1958)
 Chairman of the Board (Roulette 1958)
 Sing Along with Basie (Roulette, 1958) with Joe Williams and Lambert, Hendricks & Ross
 Basie One More Time (Roulette, 1959)
 Breakfast Dance and Barbecue (Roulette, 1959)
 Everyday I Have the Blues (Roulette, 1959)
 Dance Along with Basie (Roulette, 1959)
 String Along with Basie (Roulette, 1960)
 Not Now, I'll Tell You When (Roulette, 1960)
 The Count Basie Story (Roulette, 1960)
 Kansas City Suite (Roulette, 1960)
 First Time! The Count Meets the Duke (Columbia, 1961)
 The Legend (Roulette, 1961)
 Back with Basie (Roulette, 1962)
 Basie in Sweden (Roulette, 1962)
 On My Way & Shoutin' Again! (Verve, 1962)
 This Time by Basie! (Reprise, 1963)
 More Hits of the 50's and 60's (Verve, 1963)
 Ella and Basie! (Verve, 1963)With Benny CarterOver the Rainbow (MusicMasters, 1989)
Harlem Renaissance (MusicMasters, 1992)With Ron CarterParade (Milestone, 1979)
 Empire Jazz (RSO, 1980)With Kenny Clarke Telefunken Blues (Savoy, 1955)With Hank Crawford Mr. Blues Plays Lady Soul (Atlantic, 1969)With Charles EarlandInfant Eyes (Muse, 1979)With Harry Edison Swing Summit (Candid, 1990)With Frank Foster No 'Count (Savoy, 1956)With Gene Harris It's the Real Soul (Concord, 1995)With Johnny HartmanOnce in Every Life (Bee Hive, 1980)With Coleman HawkinsThe Saxophone Section (World Wide, 1958)With Johnny HodgesBlue Notes (Verve, 1966)
 Don't Sleep in the Subway (Verve, 1967)
 3 Shades of Blue (Flying Dutchman, 1970)With Bobby Hutcherson Conception: The Gift of Love (Columbia, 1979)With Milt Jackson Meet Milt Jackson (Savoy, 1955)
 Opus de Jazz (Savoy, 1955)
 Bags & Flutes (Atlantic, 1957)With J. J. Johnson Broadway Express (RCA Victor, 1965)With Elvin Jones Elvin! (Riverside, 1961–62)
 And Then Again (Atlantic, 1965)
 Time Capsule (Vanguard, 1977)With Etta JonesEtta Jones Sings (Roulette, 1965)With Philly Joe Jones DameroniaTo Tadd with Love (Uptown, 1982)
 Look Stop Listen (Uptown, 1983) With Quincy Jones The Birth of a Band! (Mercury, 1959)
Quincy Plays for Pussycats (Mercury, 1959-65 [1965])With Thad Jones Olio (Prestige, 1957)
 After Hours (Prestige, 1957)With Dick KatzIn High Profile (Bee Hive, 1984)With Yusef Lateef Part of the Search (Atlantic, 1973)With Junior Mance I Believe to My Soul (Atlantic, 1968)With Arif Mardin Journey (Atlantic, 1974)With Les McCann Another Beginning (Atlantic, 1974)With Jimmy McGriff The Big Band (Solid State, 1966)
Straight Up (Milestone, 1998)With Charles McPherson Today's Man (Mainstream, 1973)With Helen MerrillYou've Got a Date with the Blues (MetroJazz, 1959)With Oliver Nelson The Spirit of '67 with Pee Wee Russell (Impulse!, 1967)With David Newman The Weapon (Atlantic, 1973)With Joe Newman The Count's Men (Jazztone, 1955)
 I Feel Like a Newman (Storyville, 1956)
 The Midgets (Vik, 1956)
 The Happy Cats (Coral, 1957)
 Counting Five in Sweden (Metronome, 1958)
 Jive at Five (Swingville, 1960)With Chico O'Farrill Nine Flags (Impulse!, 1966)With Houston Person Sweet Buns & Barbeque (Prestige, 1972)With Buddy Rich The Wailing Buddy Rich (Norgran, 1955)With A. K. Salim Flute Suite (Savoy, 1957) with Herbie MannWith Woody Shaw Rosewood (Columbia, 1977)With Zoot Sims Passion Flower: Zoot Sims Plays Duke Ellington (1979) With Melvin Sparks Akilah! (Prestige, 1972)With Leon Spencer Where I'm Coming From (Prestige, 1973)With Dakota StatonI Want a Country Man (Groove Merchant, 1973)With Billy Taylor Billy Taylor with Four Flutes (Riverside, 1959)
 Kwamina (Mercury, 1961)With Charles Williams Stickball (Mainstream, 1972)With Gerald Wilson New York, New Sound (Mack Avenue, 2003)With Lem Winchester'''Another Opus'' (New Jazz, 1960)

References

External links

frankwess.org

1922 births
2013 deaths
American jazz bandleaders
American jazz flautists
American jazz saxophonists
American male saxophonists
American jazz composers
American male jazz composers
Bebop flautists
Bebop saxophonists
Concord Records artists
Chiaroscuro Records artists
Cool jazz flautists
Cool jazz saxophonists
Count Basie Orchestra members
Mainstream jazz flautists
Mainstream jazz saxophonists
Modal jazz saxophonists
New York Jazz Quartet members
Musicians from Kansas City, Missouri
Prestige Records artists
Savoy Records artists
Swing flautists
Swing saxophonists
Jazz musicians from Missouri
Dameronia members
American Jazz Orchestra members
Statesmen of Jazz members
American military personnel of World War II
Uptown Records (jazz) artists